The Lincoln County Courthouse in Lincoln in Lincoln County, Kansas is located at 3rd and Lincoln Ave. It was built in 1899–1901. It was listed on the National Register of Historic Places in 1976.

It was built to replace an 1873 stone courthouse which was destroyed by a fire on the night of December 7, 1898.

It is a two-story Richardsonian Romanesque-style limestone building with a basement and has a central clock tower.

References

External links

Government buildings on the National Register of Historic Places in Kansas
Romanesque Revival architecture in Kansas
Government buildings completed in 1899
Lincoln County, Kansas
Courthouses in Kansas